Financial models with long-tailed distributions and volatility clustering have been introduced to overcome problems with the realism of classical financial models. These classical models of financial time series typically assume homoskedasticity and normality cannot explain stylized phenomena such as skewness, heavy tails, and volatility clustering of the empirical asset returns in finance. In 1963, Benoit Mandelbrot first used the stable (or -stable) distribution to model the empirical distributions which have the skewness and heavy-tail property. Since -stable distributions have infinite -th moments for all , the tempered stable processes have been proposed for overcoming this limitation of the stable distribution.

On the other hand, GARCH models have been developed to explain the volatility clustering. In the GARCH model, the innovation (or residual) distributions are assumed to be a standard normal distribution, despite the fact that this assumption is often rejected empirically. For this reason, GARCH models with non-normal innovation distribution have been developed.

Many financial models with stable and tempered stable distributions together with volatility clustering have been developed and applied to risk management, option pricing, and portfolio selection.

Infinitely divisible distributions 

A random variable  is called infinitely divisible if,
for each , there are independent and identically-distributed random variables

 

such that

 

where  denotes equality in distribution.

 

If  is infinitely divisible, then the characteristic function
 is given by

 

This triplet is unique.

α-Stable distributions 
A  real-valued random variable  is said to have an
-stable distribution if for any , there
are a positive number  and a real number  such that

 

where  are independent and have the same
All stable random variables are infinitely divisible. A stable random
variable  with index  is called an
-stable random variable.

Let  be an -stable random variable. Then the

 

Tempered stable distributions

An infinitely divisible distribution is called a classical tempered stable (CTS) distribution with parameter
,
if its Lévy triplet  is given by
,  and

This distribution was first introduced by under
the name of Truncated Lévy Flights and has been called the tempered stable or the KoBoL distribution. In particular, if
, then this distribution is called the CGMY
distribution which has been used for
financial modeling.

The characteristic function  for a tempered stable
distribution is given by

 

Moreover,  can be extended to the
region .

Rosiński generalized the CTS distribution under the name of the
tempered stable distribution.  The KR distribution, which is a subclass of the Rosiński's generalized tempered stable distributions, is used in finance.

An infinitely divisible distribution is called a modified tempered stable (MTS) distribution with parameter ,
if its Lévy triplet  is given by
,  and

where  and 

Here  is the modified Bessel function of the second kind.
The MTS distribution is not included in the class of Rosiński's generalized tempered stable distributions.

Volatility clustering with stable and tempered stable innovation 

In order to describe the volatility clustering effect of the return process of an asset, the GARCH model can be used. In the GARCH model, innovation is assumed that , where
 and where
the series  are modeled by

 

For that reason, new GARCH models with stable or tempered stable distributed innovation have been developed. GARCH models with -stable innovations have been introduced. Subsequently, GARCH Models with tempered stable innovations have been developed.

Objections against the use of stable distributions in Financial models are given in

Notes

References
 B. B. Mandelbrot (1963) "New Methods in Statistical Economics", Journal of Political Economy, 71, 421-440
 Svetlozar T. Rachev, Stefan Mittnik (2000) Stable Paretian Models in Finance, Wiley
 G. Samorodnitsky and M. S. Taqqu, Stable Non-Gaussian Random Processes, Chapman & Hall/CRC.
 S. I. Boyarchenko, S. Z. Levendorskiǐ (2000) "Option pricing for truncated Lévy processes", International Journal of Theoretical and Applied Finance, 3 (3), 549–552.
 J. Rosiński (2007) "Tempering Stable Processes", Stochastic Processes and their Applications, 117 (6), 677–707.

Actuarial science
Financial models